Pedioplanis undata, known commonly as the plain sand lizard or the western sand lizard, is a species of lizard in the family Lacertidae. The species is endemic to Southern Africa.

Geographic range
P. undata is found in southern Namibia and in South Africa (northwestern Cape Province).

Description
P. undata is a small and slender species, closely resembling P. namaquensis. However, the lower eyelid of P. undata has a "window" formed by 2–4 semitransparent large scales.

Diet
P. undata preys upon small insects.

Reproduction
P. undata is oviparous.

References

Further reading
Boulenger GA (1887). Catalogue of the Lizards in the British Museum (Natural History). Second Edition. Volume III. Lacertidæ ... London: Trustees of the British Museum (Natural History). (Taylor and Francis, printers). xii + 575 pp. + Plates I–XL. (Eremias undata, p. 92).
Conradie W, Measey GJ, Branch WR, Tolley KA (2012). "Revised phylogeny of African sand lizards (Pedioplanis), with description of two new species from south-western Angola". African Journal of Herpetology 61 (2): 91–112.
Duméril AMC, Bibron G (1839). Erpétologie générale ou Histoire naturelle complète des Reptiles. Tome cinquième [Volume 5]. Paris: Roret. viii + 854 pp. (Lacerta undata, new species, pp. 316–317). (in French).
Kirchhof S, Hipsley CA, Corl A, Dell'Mour H, Müller J (2014). "Pedioplanis undata (A. Smith, 1838), Western Sand Lizard". African Herp News, Newsletter of the Herpetological Association of Africa 61: 30–33. (Figures 1, 2, 3A, 3B, 3C, 3D).
Smith A (1838). "Contributions to the Natural History of Southern Africa". Magazine of Natural History 2: 92–94. (Lacerta undata, new species, p. 93).

Pedioplanis
Lacertid lizards of Africa
Reptiles of Namibia
Reptiles of South Africa
Reptiles described in 1838
Taxa named by Andrew Smith (zoologist)